This is the third edition of the Copa Bolivia. The defending champions are Oriente Petrolero after winning 3-2 over The  Strongest.

 Oriente Petrolero Qualified to the Group Stage as the defending Champion .
 The Strongest Qualified to the Play-off Round as the runner-up.

First qualifying round

Second qualifying round

Third qualifying round

Play-off Round

Group stage

Group A

Standings

Results

Group B

Standings

Results

Semi-final

Second Leg

Final

First Leg

Second Leg

Bol
Bol